Volodymyr Vitaliyovych Shopin (born 9 May 1991) is a Ukrainian professional footballer who plays as a left-back for Metalist Kharkiv.

References

External links
 Profile on Metalist Kharkiv official website

1991 births
Living people
Footballers from Kharkiv
Ukrainian First League players
Ukrainian Second League players
FC Cherkashchyna players
FC Helios Kharkiv players
MFC Mykolaiv players
SC Tavriya Simferopol players
FC Hirnyk-Sport Horishni Plavni players
FC Metalist Kharkiv players
Association football defenders
Ukrainian footballers